A running survey is a rough survey made by a vessel while coasting.  Bearings to landmarks are taken at intervals as the vessel sails offshore, and are used to fix features on the coast and further inland. Intervening coastal detail is sketched in.  

The method was used by James Cook, and subsequently by navigators who sailed under—or were influenced by—him, including George Vancouver, William Bligh and Matthew Flinders.

References

Navigation
Surveying
James Cook